Cecilia Prugna (born 7 November 1997) is an Italian footballer who plays as a midfielder for Sampdoria, on loan from AS Roma.

Club career
On 2 July 2021, Prugna renewed her contract with Empoli, keeping her with the club for the 2021–22 season. After six season playing with Empoli, during summer 2022 moved to Sampdoria, on loan from AS Roma.

International career
Prugna made her debut for the Italy national team on 10 April 2021, coming on as a substitute for Melissa Bellucci against Iceland.

References

1997 births
Living people
Women's association football midfielders
Italian women's footballers
Italy women's international footballers
S.S.D. Empoli Ladies FBC players
U.C. Sampdoria (women) players